The 2017–18 Perth Glory FC W-League season was the club's tenth participation in the W-League, since the league's formation in 2008.

Players

Squad information

Coaching Team
Coach:  Bobby Despotovski
Assistant Coach:  Jessine Bonzas

Transfers
 Note: Flags indicate national team as defined under FIFA eligibility rules. Players may hold more than one non-FIFA nationality.

Statistics

Squad statistics

Competitions

W-League

League table

Results summary

Results by round

Fixtures

References

External links
 Official Website

Perth Glory FC (A-League Women) seasons
Perth Glory